Mixtepec Zapotec (San Juan Mixtepec Zapotec, Eastern Miahuatlán Zapotec) is an Oto-Manguean language of Oaxaca, Mexico. It is reported to have 80% intelligibility with Lapaguía Zapotec, but with only 45% intelligibility in the other direction.

The variety of San Jose Lachiguiri is perhaps a separate language.

References

Zapotec languages